Tyler Brock (1787–1863?) is a fictional character in the novel Tai-Pan. He is the Tai-pan, or "supreme leader" of Brock & Sons Trading Company, and the novel's antagonist. He is married to Liza Brock and has several children, including his sons Gorth, Morgan and Tom, and daughters Tess and Elizabeth. Brock is presented as a tough character, with a rough, North English accent and an eyepatch. He competes fiercely with protagonist Dirk Struan, Tai-pan of Struan's Trading Company - known as the Noble House.

Brock's enmity with Struan precedes the events of the book. Brock, being older than Struan, was the 3rd mate on ship The Vagrant Star, on which Struan was a deckhand.  Brock takes an instant dislike to Struan and has him whipped for every possible infraction, making Struan's life  on the ship hellish.  This ended one night when their ship hit a reef and sank. Brock and Struan survived, and each began to build their respective companies.

Brock lost an eye sometime prior to the book, when his vessel was hit by wind. He was pinned under a broken mastbeam and thrashed about the face by a loose halyard, whose metal-capped end gouged out his eye. Despite his overwhelming hatred for Dirk Struan he passes up outside assistance in bringing down the Noble House, preferring to do it himself.
  
Tyler Brock almost succeeds in destroying the Noble House by causing a run on the bank where Struan and his brother, Robb, have concentrated their company's financial reserves but Struan is saved by his Chinese business partners through the "four coin halves" loan, and Struan dies in a typhoon before the battle to the death that both men have anticipated. In classic Shakespearean fashion Tyler's daughter Tess and Dirk's son Culum fall in love, getting married and condemning their fathers' hatred. Tyler Brock expects to absorb the Noble House after Dirk Struan's death but Culum is inspired to respond by sending Brock some coins with the message to "buy yourself a coffin."

The novel leaves us at that, but future books in James Clavell's saga reveal the end of Tyler Brock.

When Culum dies, Tess takes over as Tai-Pan and orchestrates the fall of her father in 1863.  A penniless Tyler Brock is seen pirating a Chinese junk and sailing north, screaming promises to rebuild his fortune and come back for the coveted title of "Noble House."

He is never seen or heard from again.

John Stanton played Brock in the 1986 film Tai Pan. George MacDonald Fraser, who wrote an unused script adaptation of Tai Pan in the late 1970s, thought Oliver Reed would have been ideal casting for the role of Brock.

References

Brock, Tyler